José Antonio Jimenes Domínguez (1887 in Cabo Haitiano – 1938) was a Dominican Republic judge and president of the Supreme Court. He was son of president Juan Isidro Jimenes and founder of the "Boletín Mercantil" newspaper.

References

1887 births
1938 deaths
Dominican Republic judges